Albanology, also known as Albanian studies, is an interdisciplinary branch of the humanities that addresses the language, costume, literature, art, culture and history of Albanians. Within the studies the scientific methods of literature, linguistics, archeology, history and culture are used. However the Albanian language is the main point of research of the studies.

Studies 

Johann Erich Thunmann in the 18th century was probably the first Albanologist. He supported the theory of the autochthony of the Albanians and also presented the Illyrian origin theory. Later on Gustav Meyer proved that Albanian language was part of the Indo-European family.

In the 20th century such studies were deepened by Norbert Jokl, Milan Šufflay, and Franz Nopcsa von Felső-Szilvás, as well as Karl Reinhold, and Eqrem Çabej.

The studies of Albanology were more institutionally supported in Albania starting in 1940 with the opening of the Royal Institute of the Albanian Studies, which had preceded the Academy of Sciences of Albania, opened in 1972. Meanwhile, during the 1960s, the Albanology Institute of Pristina was also reconstructed in Kosovo, then part of Yugoslavia. The institute emerged from its core founded in 1953.

Notable Albanologists

Albanian-born
 Ndoc Nikaj (1864–1951)
 Gjergj Pekmezi (1872–1938)
 Fan Noli (1882–1965)
 Costa Chekrezi (1892–1959)
 Tahir Dizdari (1900–1972)
 Tajar Zavalani (1903–1966)
 Stavro Skëndi (1905–1989)
 Eqrem Çabej (1908–1980)
 Namik Resuli (1908–1985)
 Selman Riza (1909–1988)
 Aleks Buda (1910–1993)
 Petro Janura (1911–1983)
 Mahir Domi (1915–2000)
 Dhimitër Shuteriqi (1915–2003)
 Idriz Ajeti (1917–2019)
 Shaban Demiraj (1920–2014)
 Mark Krasniqi (1920–2015)
 Androkli Kostallari (1922–1992)
 Mehdi Bardhi (1927–1994)
 Jashar Rexhepagiq (1929–2010)
 Petro Zheji (1929–2015)
 Besim Bokshi (1930–2014)
 Skënder Rizaj (1930–2021)
 Fehmi Agani (1932–1999)
 Muzafer Korkuti (*1936)
 Rexhep Qosja (*1936)
 Jorgo Bulo (1939–2015)
 Anton Berisha (*1946)
 Aurel Plasari (*1956)

Foreign-born
 Demetrio Franco (1443–1525)
 Marcin Bielski (1495–1575)
 Johann Erich Thunmann (1746–1778)
 François Pouqueville (1770–1838)
 William Martin Leake (1777–1860)
 Jakob Philipp Fallmerayer (1790–1861)
 Joseph von Xylander (1794-1854)
 Johann Georg von Hahn (1811–1869)
 Karl Reinhold (1834–1880)
 Vikentij Makušev (1837–1883)
 Jan Urban Jarník (1848–1923)
 Gustav Meyer (1850–1900)
 Lajos Thallóczy (1857–1916)
 Alexandru Philippide (1859–1933)
 Theodor Anton Ippen (1861–1935)
 Carl Patsch (1865–1945)
 Antonio Baldacci (1867–1950)
 Nicolae Iorga (1871–1940)
 Mario Roques (1875–1961)
 Norbert Jokl (1877–1942)
 Franz Nopcsa von Felső-Szilvás (1877–1933)
 Milan Šufflay (1879–1931)
 Maximilian Lambertz (1882–1963)
 Marco La Piana (1883–1958)
 Margaret Hasluck (1885–1948)
 Jacques Bourcart (1891–1965)
 Giuseppe Valentini (1900–1979)
 Georg Stadtmüller (1909–1985)
 Agniya Desnitskaya (1912–1992)
 Wacław Cimochowski (1912–1982)
 Vangelis Liapis (1914–2008)
 Eric P. Hamp (1920–2019)
 Peter Schubert (1938–2003)
 James Pettifer (*1949)
 Robert Elsie (1950–2017)
 Vladimir Orel (1952–2007)
 Pasquale Scutari (*1952)
 Francesco Altimari (*1955)
 Noel Malcolm (*1956)
 Marko Snoj (*1959)
 Oliver Schmitt (*1973)

See also
Historiography of Albania
Balkan studies

References

External links
International Network of Albanology